Basketball at the 2015 Games of the Small States of Europe was held from 1 to 6 June 2015.

Medal summary

Men's tournament
Men's tournament was played by only four teams:

Table

|}

Matches

Women's tournament
Women's tournament will be played by only four teams:

Table

|}

Matches

References

External links
Basketball at the 2015 GSSE Official Website
GSSE Official Website

2014–15 in Icelandic basketball
2015 Games of the Small States of Europe
2015
Basketball competitions in Iceland
Small